The Archdiocese of Turku is the oldest diocese in Finland. Medieval bishops of the Catholic Church were also de facto secular leaders of the country until the end of the 13th century.

After the Reformation in Scandinavia, Lutheran bishops became state officials. When Finland became a separate grand duchy, the then Bishop of Turku was designated as an Archbishop in 1817. Since 1868, the Archbishops of Turku and Finland have been considered primates of the Evangelical Lutheran Church of Finland.

Bishop Henry 
Henry, Bishop of Uppsala is often mentioned in contemporary sources as the first Bishop of Finland. According to legends, the English-born Henry arrived in Finland with King Eric IX of Sweden during the First Swedish Crusade, later suffering martyrdom in the 1150s. His position as Bishop of Finland is, however, totally unhistorical, and not claimed even by legends.

Catholic bishops of Finland 

See article Diocese of Finland.

Rodulff 1156?–1178? (first mentioned in the 15th century, uncertain)
Fulco 1178?–1198? (first mentioned in the 15th century, uncertain)
An unnamed Bishop of Finland is mentioned dead in 1209. Papal letters to unnamed Bishops of Finland have survived from 1221, 1229 and 1232.
Thomas 1230s?–1245 
Bero I 1248–1258

Catholic bishops of Turku (Åbo, Aboa) 
The position Bishop of Finland was renamed Bishop of Turku, first mentioned in 1259, in a move to harmonise the name of the dioceses with other Swedish sees. 

Ragvald I, 1258–1266
Catillus, 1266–1286
Johannes I, 1286–1290
Magnus I, 1291–1308 
Ragvald II, 1309–1321
Benedictus II Gregor, 1321–1338 
Hemming, 1338–1366
Henrik Hartmansson, 1366–1367 
Johannes II Petri, 1367–1370
Johannes III Westfal, 1370–1384
Bero II Balk, 1387–1412
Magnus II Tavast, 1412–1450
Olaus Magni, 1450–1460
Konrad Bitz, 1460–1489
Magnus III Nicolai, 1489–1500
Laurentius Michaelis, 1500–1506
Johannes IV Olavi, 1507–1510
Arvid Kurki, 1511–1522
Ericus Svenonius, 1523–1527
Martti Skytte. 1528–1550

Lutheran Bishops of Turku 
Mikael Agricola 1554–1557
Petrus Follingius 1558–1563
Paulus Juusten 1563–1575
Ericus Erici Sorolainen 1583–1625
Isaacus Rothovius 1627–1652
 Eskillus Petraeus 1652–1657
 Johannes Terserus 1658–1664
 Johannes Gezelius the elder 1664–1690
 Johannes Gezelius the younger 1690–1718
 Herman Witte 1721–1728
 Lars Tammelin 1728–1733
 Jonas Fahlenius 1734–1746
 Johan Browallius 1749–1755
 Karl Fredrik Mennander 1757–1775
 Jakob Haartman 1776–1788
 Jakob Gadolin 1788–1802
 Jakob Tengström 1803–1817

The title "Bishop of Turku" ceased to exist in 1817. Since 1998, the Archbishop of Turku has been assisted in the diocese by a Bishop of Turku.

 Ilkka Kantola 1998–2005
 Kari Mäkinen 2006–2010
 Kaarlo Kalliala 2011–2021
 Mari Leppänen 2021–

Archbishops of Turku and Finland 

Bishop of Turku was elevated to archiepiscopal rank in 1817. ''The title of the see was changed to Archbishop of Turku and Finland.

 Jakob Tengström 1817–1832
 Erik Gabriel Melartin 1833–1847
 Edvard Bergenheim 1850–1884
 Torsten Thure Renvall 1884–1898
 Gustaf Johansson 1899–1930
 Lauri Ingman 1930–1934
 Erkki Kaila 1935–1944
 Aleksi Lehtonen 1945–1951
 Ilmari Salomies 1951–1964
 Martti Simojoki 1964–1978
 Mikko Juva 1978–1982
 John Vikström 1982–1998
 Jukka Paarma 1998–2010
 Kari Mäkinen 2010–2018
 Tapio Luoma 2018–

See also    
 Archdiocese of Turku  
 Roman Catholic Diocese of Helsinki

References

External links 
Evangelical Lutheran Church of Finland – Official site

Turku
 Turku
Turku
Turku
Turku
History of Christianity in Finland